Glis was an electronic music project founded in 2001 by Shaun Frandsen of Seattle, WA. The band experienced several lineup changes and guest appearances, with frontman Shaun Frandsen acting as primary producer, vocalist, songwriter, and instrumentalist. Notable guest, Jean-Luc De Meyer of Front 242, contributed vocals for two studio tracks on the album "Nemesis" in 2005. Glis began to use guitar as a production counterpoint on the album "Phoenix" in 2013.

Discography

Albums
2001: Extract
2003: Balance
2003: Equilibrium (remix)
2005: Nemesis
2008: A Shot and a Bassline (remix)
2013: Phoenix

Singles & EPs
2004: Disappear!
2012: Apocalypse Parties
2013: Seconds

References

 Glis / Shaun Frandsen
 Glis – Phoenix | mxdwn.com Reviews

American electronic musicians
American industrial music groups